The Things We Carry is a studio album by the straight edge hardcore punk band Have Heart. It was released in 2006.

Critical reception
Las Vegas Weekly called the album "the defining hardcore record of the century so far." Punknews.org wrote that "with undeniably earnest lyrics and a blistering, relentless pace, The Things We Carry sets the standards high for what modern day straight-edge hardcore albums should sound like."

Track listing 
 "Life Is Hard Enough" – 0:56
 "Watch Me Sink" – 3:15
 "Armed with a Mind" – 3:14
 "About Face" – 2:38
 "The Unbreakable" – 2:04
 "Old Man II (Last Words and Lessons Learned)" – 2:56
 "Song of Shame" – 1:24
 "To Us Fools" – 0:23
 "Something More Than Ink" – 2:36
 "The Machinist" – 3:01
 "Watch Me Rise" – 3:29

Personnel 
Members
 Patrick Flynn - vocals
 Ryan Hudon - guitar
 Kei Yasui - guitar
 Ryan Briggs - bass
 Shawn Costa - drums

Production
Engineered by Jim Siegel, March 2006
Mastered by David Locke, @ JP Masters, Boston, Massachusetts
Guest vocals by JD, Kenny, Sean Murphy & Pete Maher
Backing vocals by Brendan Dougherty, Eric Lepine, Kenny, Matt Dude, Nick Dub, Pauly Edge, Sean Mckendry, Sean Murphy, Pete Maher & Todd Pollock
Artwork by Don Naylor
Layout by Chris Wrenn & Kei Yasui
Photo by Todd Pollock

References

2006 albums
Bridge 9 Records albums